Republic of Texas–United States relations refers to the historical foreign relations between the now-defunct Republic of Texas and the United States of America. Relations started in 1836 after the Texas Revolution, and ended in 1845 upon the annexation of Texas by the United States.

U.S. involvement in Texan independence
Following Mexico's independence from the Spanish Empire in 1821, the population of Texas included only 4,000 Tejanos. The new Mexican government, eager to populate the region, encouraged foreigners, including residents of the United States, to help settle the region; by 1830 the number of American settlers in Texas topped 30,000. The new settlers re-introduced slavery to Texas even though the 1824 Mexican constitution declared the process illegal; in 1831 the Mexican government began to combat slavery in Texas, intensifying the desire of the Texans to seek independence from Mexico City.
By 1835 Sam Houston and other Texans had initiated the struggle for independence. The United States decided to support the revolution by providing arms and supplies to the Texas rebels, eventually leading to independence and the founding of the Republic of Texas
in 1836.

Bilateral relations
The United States recognized Texan independence on March 3, 1836, when U.S. President Andrew Jackson nominated Alcée La Branche as Minister to Texas. Diplomatic relations began when the U.S. Secretary of State accepted the credentials of William H. Wharton, Texan Minister to the United States, on March 6, 1837. Alcée La Branche, the appointed Chargé d'Affaires of the U.S. Legation in Houston, then functioning as the seat of government, presented his credentials sometime between October 23 and 27, 1837. In 1841 The United States' chargé d'affairs to Texas opened a legation in Austin, in 1841 The Republic of Texas opened an embassy in Washington, DC.

Prior to Texan independence, a consulate was established at Galveston, and Joseph Washington Eliot Wallace was confirmed as consul on March 29, 1830. Additional consulates existed at the following locations: 
Goliad: Earliest Date: January 9, 1835. No extant latest date.
Matagorda: Earliest Date: June 26, 1838. No extant latest date. 
Sabine: Earliest Date: March 21, 1843. Latest date: December 29, 1845
Velasco (Freeport) Earliest Date: October 12, 1837. No extant latest date.

Although Texas entered the United States as a state on December 29, 1845, relations formally ended during the transfer of Texan sovereignty to the United States on February 19, 1846. Despite this, Andrew J. Donelson, the last U.S. Chargé d'Affaires, left his post on or shortly after August 9, 1845.

Treaties
On April 11, 1838, the U.S. concluded a Claims Convention with the Republic of Texas. This agreement was signed by Alcée La Branche, the U.S. Chargé d'Affaires near the Republic of Texas and R.A. Irion, the Secretary of State of the Republic of Texas, and served to set Texan indemnity to the United States for injuries suffered by U.S. Citizens by Texan authorities as well as indemnity to compensate U.S. merchants for the capture, seizure, and confiscation of two U.S. vessels.

On April 25, 1838, the U.S. and the Republic of Texas signed a convention to mark the boundary between the two states.

U.S. annexation of Texas

Relations between Texas and the US were strong; however, Texas had become unstable and unfit to fully defend or sustain itself, prompting the US to consider annexation. A vast majority of Texians supported the annexation, and on December 29, 1845, Texas was admitted to the Union as the 28th state. A few months later, an unsolvable border dispute between the now U.S.-controlled Texan state and Mexico prompted the Mexican–American War.

Issues
One of the issues at play in the interactions between the United States and the Republic of Texas was the eventual annexation of Texas by the U.S. There were two main difficulties with the issue of Texas joining the United States at the time: first, incorporating Texas into the Union might provoke Mexico; and second, Texas wished to join as a slave state.

On August 23, 1843, Mexican Foreign Minister Bocanegra informed U.S. Envoy Extraordinary and Minister Plenipotentiary to Mexico, Waddy Thompson, that U.S. annexation of Texas would be grounds for war. On March 1, 1845, U.S. President John Tyler signed a congressional joint resolution favoring the annexation of Texas. On March 4, 1845, U.S. President James Knox Polk noted his approval of the "reunion" of the Republic of Texas with the United States in his inaugural address. In response, the Mexican Minister of Foreign Affairs informed U.S. Minister to Mexico, Wilson Shannon, on March 28, 1845, that Mexico was severing diplomatic relations with the United States. In December 1845 Texas was admitted to the union as the twenty-eighth state. In April 1846, Mexican troops attacked what they perceived to be invading U.S. forces that had occupied territory claimed by both Mexico and the United States, and on May 13, the U.S. Congress declared war against Mexico.

Another issue raised by the debate over Texan annexation was that of slavery. Since the early nineteenth century, Texas was a producer of cotton. It was also dependent upon slave labor to produce its cotton. The question of whether or not the United States should annex Texas came at a time of increased tensions between the Northern and Southern states of the Union over the legality and morality of slavery; thus the possibility of admitting Texas as another slave state proved to be contentious.

Additionally, there was another issue raised by the Texas-cotton nexus: that of the market for raw cotton. One of the largest export markets for North American raw cotton in the mid-nineteenth century was Great Britain. As long as Texas remained an independent state, it could give Southern U.S. cotton plantation owners competition in terms of setting prices – to force them to be more competitive.

See also
 Republic of Texas–Mexico relations
 Texas Revolution
 History of Texas
 Mexican–American War
 Texas Annexation
 Mexico–United States relations

References

 
Texas, Republic
Texas Revolution
Colonial United States (Mexican)
United States